Russell Hodgkinson (Florida, August 14, 1959) is an American actor, known for his role in the Syfy television network series Z Nation as Steven "Doc" Beck.

Personal life

Hodgkinson was born on August 14, 1959 at Homestead Air Force Base in Florida and served in the military before becoming an actor.

Selected filmography

Film

Television

References

External links
 

1959 births
Male actors from Florida
Living people